Bobadilla may refer to:

People
Bobadilla (surname)

Places
 Bobadilla, Chile, a town in Maule Region, Chile
 Bobadilla, La Rioja, a municipality in La Rioja, Spain
 Bobadilla, Antequera, a village in Andalusia, Spain
 Bobadilla railway station
 Bobadilla del Campo (or Bobadilla), a municipality in Castile and León, Spain